The 2022 FINA Men's Water Polo World League was the 20th edition of the annual men's international water polo tournament.

Italy won the title for the first time after a win over the United States.

European qualification round
The draw for the european qualification round was conducted in Lausanne, Switzerland on 17 November 2021.

First round
Each team played one home and one away game. After the group stage, the top two teams from each group advanced to the second round.

Group A

Group B

Group C

Group D

Second round
28–30 April 2022, Podgorica, Montenegro
The top three teams, alongside host France, played at the World League Super Final.

5th–8th place bracket

Final ranking

Intercontinental Cup
7–13 March 2022, Lima, Peru

Group stage

Knockout stage

Classfication

Super Final

Teams
As host country
 

Qualified teams

Invited teams

Preliminary round

Group A

Group B

Knockout stage

Bracket

Quarterfinals

5th–8th place bracket

5–8th place semifinals

Seventh place game

Fifth place game

Semifinals

Third place game

Final

Final ranking

References

External links
FINA website

FINA Water Polo World League
World League, men